In the mathematical classification of finite simple groups, a thin group is a finite group such that for every odd prime number p, the Sylow p-subgroups of the 2-local subgroups are cyclic. Informally, these are the groups that resemble rank 1 groups of Lie type over a finite field of characteristic 2.

 defined thin groups and classified those of characteristic 2 type in which all 2-local subgroups are solvable.
The list of finite simple thin groups consists of:
The projective special linear groups PSL2(q) and PSL3(p) for  p = 1 + 2a3b and PSL3(4)
The projective special unitary groups PSU3(p) for p =−1 + 2a3b and b = 0 or 1 and PSU3(2n)
The Suzuki groups Sz(2n)
The Tits group 2F4(2)'
The Steinberg group 3D4(2)
The Mathieu group M11
The Janko group J1

See also
Quasithin group

References

Finite groups